The 2021–22 season was the 120th season in the existence of Manchester City Football Club and their 20th consecutive season in the top flight of English football. In addition to the domestic league, Manchester City also participated in this season's editions of the FA Cup, EFL Cup, Community Shield and UEFA Champions League.

The club kicked off the season by losing the Community Shield to Leicester City and was later knocked out of the EFL Cup by West Ham United in the fourth round, ending their unbeaten streak in the competition that stretched to nearly five years. City also reached the FA Cup semi-finals for the fifth time in Guardiola's six season tenure, but were beaten by Liverpool, their third consecutive semi-final defeat. In Europe, the Blues were coming off their most successful Champions League campaign in history and looked to improve on last season's final defeat to Chelsea. City reached the semi-finals again, but were defeated there by Real Madrid 6–5 on aggregate a.e.t. over two closely fought and very dramatic games. On a brighter note, the Blues successfully retained the Premier League title for the second time in their history, also making it four titles in five seasons, in another closely fought title race with Liverpool. They won the league by a point on the final matchday by coming from two goals behind after 75 minutes against Aston Villa, to score three goals in five minutes.

The season was the club's first since 2010–11 not to feature City's all-time record goalscorer Sergio Agüero, who had left the club for Barcelona on a free transfer at the end of the previous season; he then went on to retire from football following cardiac health problems in November 2021. City were unable to immediately recruit a like for like replacement for Agüero, and this season was notable for Pep Guardiola's extensive use of a False 9 role. This proved to be no impediment to the Citizens scoring the most goals in all competitions (150) of any senior top-tier professional team in Europe.

Kits
Supplier: Puma / Sponsor: Etihad Airways

Season summary

Pre-season
Euro 2020 began with 15 Manchester City first team players selected in the qualified squads, which was the joint-most representatives from a single club (shared with Chelsea). However, Joao Cancelo was forced to withdraw days after the tournament began due to a positive SARS‑CoV‑2 test result, and Eric Garcia joined Barcelona while the tournament was in progress. Out of these City players, all their squads reached the knock-out stages, seven reached the semi-finals and four England players reached the final, but ended up as runners-up.

City also had three representatives selected at the 2021 Copa América, Sergio Aguero joining Barcelona while the tournament was in progress. All three reached the final, but the two remaining Brazilian players ended up as runners-up.

As a result of having many players involved deep into these tournaments and with City's involvement in the 2021 Champions League final, City began their pre-season with all but eight of their first team rested on holiday. Only Zack Steffen, Benjamin Mendy, Riyad Mahrez and Fernandinho from the regular starters in 2020–21 were able to participate in a full pre-season. However, this gave an opportunity for several EDS players to showcase their talents for a possible first team place.

Most of the pre-season transfer speculation concerned the potential replacements for Sergio Aguero, who had left at the end of the 2020–21 season after 10 years and as the club's all-time leading goalscorer. Of the potential targets, Harry Kane was seen as the leading candidate, but was expected to command a significant and possibly record breaking transfer fee from Tottenham. There was also speculation that Jack Grealish would be signed from Aston Villa on a similarly record fee to strengthen City's creative midfield and provide additional cover for Kevin De Bruyne who had experienced several extended periods of injury absence during the previous seasons.

Grealish completed his transfer to City on 5 August 2021, signing a 6-year contract, for what at the time was a reported record British transfer fee of £100 million. He was allocated the iconic number 10 shirt, previously worn by Aguero between 2015 and 2021.

Start of season
On 7 August, Manchester City started their season with the FA Community Shield, a traditional curtain raiser played between the previous season's league champions and FA Cup winners. This was City's first FA Community Shield since 2019 when they beat Liverpool 5–4 on penalties after a 1–1 draw. On this occasion, an understrength City (many players were still out-of-form after Euro 2020) were beaten 1–0 at Wembley by Leicester City with an 89th-minute penalty won and scored by former City academy graduate Kelechi Iheanacho.

The Premier League season began with all restrictions on stadium attendances lifted for the first time since the start of the pandemic in March 2020.

City began their league season on 15 August with a third consecutive competitive 1–0 defeat, this time against Tottenham at their north London stadium. This was the first time in 10 years that City had failed to win their opening league game of the season; coincidentally the last time being a 0–0 away draw at White Hart Lane in the 2010–11 season. It was also City's fourth consecutive defeat at Tottenham since the new stadium was opened and meant that City had yet to score a goal at this ground.

On 25 August, Harry Kane announced he would be staying at Tottenham "this summer", ending the speculation that City would be able to negotiate an acceptable transfer fee with Tottenham's chairman Daniel Levy. On the same day it was reported that Pep Guardiola had revealed that he would leave the club when his current contract ends in summer 2023. However, Guardiola later retracted this and said he was talking about whenever his contract at City ended he would be considering an opportunity to manage a national side.

On 26 August, Benjamin Mendy was charged by Cheshire Constabulary with four counts of rape and one count of sexual assault. Mendy was immediately suspended by City and remanded in custody with a trial date set for 24 January 2022. This was later set back until June 2022.

On 8 September it was announced that Brazil and three other South American nations had invoked a five-day FIFA ban on Premier League players who had been called up for international duty for the 2022 World Cup qualifiers during the September international window, but who had been refused permission to travel by their clubs to avoid a 10-day quarantine period required by UK Government public health regulations when they returned from so called "Red list" countries with high levels of COVID-19 infection. This would've prevented City from including Ederson and Gabriel Jesus in their squad to play Leicester City on 11 September. However, the ban was rescinded on the morning of the fixture, and City went on to win the game 1–0 with both Brazilian players in the starting XI.

On 15 September, City beat RB Leipzig 6–3 in their first UEFA Champions League group game of the season. At the time this was Pep Guardiola's 300th game as City manager and 750th overall. The Blues became the fastest English team to register 50 Champions League wins (in 91 games) and the second fastest of all time behind Real Madrid (88 games).

Autumn period
On 21 September, City beat League One side Wycombe Wanderers 6–1 at home in the third round of the Carabao Cup. This win was Pep Guardiola's 220th as City manager, equalling the club record previously held by Les McDowell between 1950 and 1963. Guardiola had achieved this in only 302 games compared to 592 games managed by McDowell. The game was also noteworthy in that six academy graduates made their City first team debuts that night, the most in the modern history of the club academy.

On 25 September, City defeated Chelsea, one of their main title rivals, who at the time were on a streak of three consecutive wins against City, including in the Champions League final. The Blues recorded a 1–0 away win at Stamford Bridge to mark Guardiola's 221st City win and make him the most successful manager in the club's history.

On 12 October, five City players started for England versus Hungary in their 2022 FIFA World Cup qualifier 1–1 draw at Wembley Stadium. This set a new club record for representatives starting in a national team XI.

On 27 October, City were beaten 5–3 on penalties after a goalless draw at West Ham United in the fourth round of the Carabao Cup, thus ending their 4-year domination of the competition, in which they hadn't lost a competitive fixture in 21 games since the 2016–17 season.

City's early season league form was variable, and by the time of the final autumn international break in early November they had two defeats and two draws from their first 11 league fixtures and only two points more than in the 2020–21 season (where they had also started off slowly, but then had embarked on a record-breaking mid season winning streak to secure their league title). However, City had by then played all of the previous season's other top 5 clubs away from home, remaining undefeated and only dropping points in their 2–2 draw against Liverpool at Anfield. The other favourites for the league title had also dropped points; so that by 7 November City were in second place, just 3 points behind the early league leaders Chelsea, and equal on points with surprise form team West Ham. With 2 group games remaining City were also just a point from qualifying for the knockout stage of that season's Champions League.

On 24 November, City duly qualified for the last 16 of the Champions League as Group A winners when they beat Paris Saint Germain 2–1 at home.

City's 2–1 away victory against Aston Villa on 1 December was Guardiola's 150th win in the Premier League. He became only the 4th manager to achieve this at a single club and the fastest to achieve the milestone (in only 204 games).

On 4 December (gameweek 15), City beat Watford 3–1 away to notch up 5 consecutive league victories and reach the top of the Premier League for the first time that season. 

City's 1–0 win against Wolves in their following league game was notable as Raheem Sterling scored his 100th Premier League goal and Ederson kept his 100th clean sheet for the club in all competitions.

Christmas and New Year
On 14 December, City beat Leeds United 7–0 at home to record their biggest victory of the season so far. The first goal, scored by Phil Foden, marked the 500th scored by a Pep Guardiola team in the Premier League; he became the fastest to record this feat after only 207 games, beating the previous record by Jurgen Klopp (234 games). This win also was City's 33rd league victory of the calendar year, equalling a top flight record set by Liverpool in 1982.

On 19 December, City's 4–0 win away to Newcastle ensured they would stay top of the table at Christmas. It also signified two new records: for the most league wins by an English top flight team in a calendar year (34) and for the most league goals scored in a calendar year by a Premier League team (106), despite still having two league games to play before the New Year.

On 28 December, City announced that Spanish forward Ferran Torres would join Barcelona in the New Year for a reported fee of €55m (£46.3m) upfront and up to €10m (£9.3m) in possible add-ons. Torres had not played for City since the League Cup victory against Wycombe in late September due to an injury picked up during the October internationals. He had been at the club for only 18 months, but City had recouped over double his transfer fee from Valencia. Barcelona needed a forward to replace Sergio Agüero who had been forced to retire early on medical grounds a few weeks beforehand.

City maintained their ten-game league winning streak into the New Year. They ended 2021 with 50 points, eight points clear of Chelsea at the top of the table and nine points ahead of Liverpool in third place, who also had a game in hand. In all, City had won 36 league games in 2021 and scored 113 goals, setting new top division and Premier League records respectively.

Another close fought game against Chelsea, this time at the Etihad, was won 1–0 on 15 January thanks to a beautiful Kevin De Bruyne curling shot, producing a statement victory for the Blues and extending their league winning run to 12 games. The result put City on 56 points, thirteen ahead of Chelsea in second and fourteen ahead of Liverpool in third, who still had two games in hand.

However, City's winning streak was ended in the following game on 22 January when they drew 1–1 away to Southampton and their league lead was cut to nine points from Liverpool, who still had a game in hand. However, the result signified another new record as Guardiola became the fastest manager to reach 500 Premier League points earned, in only 213 games – eighteen games fewer than his closest rival.

On winter transfer deadline day, City announced that they had signed 22 year-old Argentine versatile forward Julián Álvarez for a reported £14.1 million fee from River Plate. Álvarez had subsequently been loaned back to River Plate until at least July 2022 so that he would be able to participate in the 2022 Copa Libertadores for his previous club. If River Plate qualified to the quarter-finals or beyond his loan might be extended as far as the break for the 2022 FIFA World Cup. At the time, Álvarez was the current South American Footballer of the Year and the golden boot holder for the Argentine Primera Division.

Spring period
Raheem Sterling scored City's first hat-trick of the season in their 4–0 win away to Norwich City in the Premier League on 12 February 2022. It was notable as a perfect hat-trick, and took Sterling onto the list of top 10 goal-scorers in all competitions for the club .

City earnt a commanding first leg lead in their Champions League round of 16 tie against Sporting Lisbon, beating the Portuguese champions 5–0 away on 15 February, including a brace from Bernardo Silva.

However, they went on to be beaten 3–2 at home by Spurs in their next league fixture; their first league defeat for four months; and a result which closed the gap at the top of the table to second placed Liverpool to only 6 points, with Liverpool still having a game in hand and still to play City at the Etihad in early April. City had equalised twice in the game, including a 92nd minute penalty from Riyad Mahrez (which was notable as City's 100th goal in all competitions that season), but the game was won by a headed goal in the 95th minute from erstwhile City transfer target Harry Kane, who had already scored Spurs second goal earlier in the second half.

An outstanding team performance against their closest rivals saw City convincingly beat Manchester United 4–1 at home on 6 March with a brace apiece from Riyad Mahrez and man of the match Kevin De Bruyne. This broke a sequence of 3 consecutive derby losses at home. Mahrez had now scored over 20 goals in a season in all competitions for the first time in his career and De Bruyne passed the milestone of fifty Premier League goals. The result still meant City led the league from Liverpool by 6 points having played a game more.

City drew 0–0 with Sporting on 9 March in the second leg of their Champions League round of 16 tie to win 5–0 on aggregate and qualify for the quarter-finals for the fifth season in succession. By the time of the March international break, City's lead in the league had been cut to 1 point after another frustrating 0–0 draw with Crystal Palace at Selhurst Park on 14 March and Liverpool's continued league winning streak since January. On a brighter note, the Blues qualified for their fourth consecutive FA Cup semi-final when they beat Southampton 4–1 at St. Mary's on 20 March.

Season run-in
City returned from the March international break knowing they had up to 16 games of the season remaining over eight weeks, in which they could secure a treble of titles. This would start with a sequence of five games over 14 days where the Blues would play both Atlético Madrid and Liverpool twice in alternating fixtures: the two-legged Champions League quarter-finals, a potentially decisive home league fixture and a FA Cup semi-final at Wembley.

However, first City had to retake the top spot from Liverpool, which they successfully accomplished by beating Burnley 2–0 at Turf Moor on 2 April, after their rivals had defeated Watford by the same score at home earlier that day. Three days later, a 1–0 victory over Atlético in the first leg of the Champions League quarter-finals gave City a slender advantage before heading to Madrid. On 10 April, an exciting and high quality 2–2 home draw against Liverpool ensured City retained a single point advantage at the top of the league with seven games remaining.

Just three days after a title decider versus Liverpool, City faced Atlético on the road. An intense and maturely hard fought 0–0 draw in Madrid ensured City progressed to the semi-finals for the second consecutive season. There, the Blues would face Real Madrid who had closely beaten Chelsea over the two legs. Unfortunately, the closeness of the Atlético tie prevented Guardiola from resting his strongest squad, and several key players suffered injuries while Jürgen Klopp was able to effectively play his "B team" in Liverpool's quarter-final home tie against Benfica the same night.

The FA Cup semi-final awaited just three days, on 16 April, after an excruciating battle with Atlético. As such, Guardiola was forced to make seven changes for the match against Liverpool. A dominant display from the Scoursers at Wembley saw them take a three goal lead against an underperforming City side by half-time, including a Sadio Mané goal which resulted from an error from back up keeper Zack Steffen, who Guardiola always selected to play in City's domestic cup fixtures. The Blues managed to improve in the second half and goals from Jack Grealish and Bernardo Silva were able to almost overturn the deficit, but Liverpool withstood the pressure to 3–2, ending Citizens' hopes of the treble. Although Manchester City had reached five FA Cup semi-finals during Guardiola's tenure at the club, they had only succeeded in reaching one final (in 2019), while losing three consecutive FA Cup semi-finals starting from 2020 and also losing three consecutive appearances at Wembley.

A 3–0 win against Brighton on 20 April saw City keep Liverpool at the same distance of a point. This victory was Guardiola's 250th as City manager in all competitions. Just three days later, the Blues produced another convincing win, this time beating Watford 5–1. Gabriel Jesus scored four goals and became the third City player to do so in a Premier League match after Sergio Agüero and Edin Džeko. This was also City's 15th consecutive Premier League victory against the Hornets, setting another PL record.

Another three days later, on 26 April, Manchester City defeated Real Madrid 4–3 in an outstanding game at a capacity Etihad Stadium to take a slight advantage to the Santiago Bernabéu. City scored in under 2 minutes, as Kevin De Bruyne finished the fastest goal in European Cup semi-finals history, and had held a two-goal advantage on three occasions during the match, while also squandering multiple good opportunities to increase the lead, only to see a resilient Madrid side reduce the deficit to a single goal, courtesy of a brace (which included a Panenka penalty) from Real Madrid's top scorer, captain and talisman Karim Benzema.

In their next league game, City beat Leeds away 4–0 to keep a one point lead over Liverpool with just four PL games remaining. City had not conceded a league goal away from home in five consecutive fixtures and had remained undefeated in 16 away league games since their opening day loss at Tottenham (both new club records). Captain Fernandihno came on as a substitute to become the Brazilian player with the most Premier League appearances and celebrated by scoring City's final goal.

End of season
4 May was a tough day for the Blues, as they failed to reach the Champions League final in the most dramatic and heartbreaking fashion at the Santiago Bernabéu. Leading the game 1–0 (5–3 on aggregate), from a 75th minute goal by Riyad Mahrez, City once again squandered several opportunities to put the game to bed and collapsed in the last minutes of the match. Approaching the injury time, it appeared City were heading comfortably to the final, where they would have met rivals Liverpool; however, two goals in a minute from Madrid's substitute striker Rodrygo sent the game into extra time, and another penalty from Benzema five minutes later proved to be the winner as City were defeated 1–3 (5–6 on aggregate).

The heartbreak, however, did not derail City as some rivals might have hoped. By the time of City's next league game on 8 May, Liverpool had finally dropped points in the title race by drawing 1–1 against Tottenham at Anfield. City were able to put their shock and disappointment from the Bernabéu to one side and capitalise on this, opening up a three point lead and a four goal difference advantage after a 5–0 thrashing of revitalised Newcastle United with a brace from Raheem Sterling and another man of the match performance from Kevin De Bruyne. The Blues required seven more points from three remaining fixtures to secure and retain their league title.

On 10 May, the club officially announced it had reached agreement with Borussia Dortmund to sign young Norwegian striker Erling Haaland on 1 July 2022 subject to completing terms. Haaland, the son of ex-City and Leeds midfielder Alfie Haaland, is one of the most sought after players in world football having scored 85 goals in 88 appearances for Dortmund, and could become the  replacement for Sergio Aguero the club had been seeking.

Another big 5–1 win away to Wolves on 11 May, including four goals from Kevin De Bruyne, and a 24 minute hat-trick (the third fastest from the start of a game in Premier League history), reduced City's target to getting a maximum of four points from two remaining fixtures to retain their title. This game was Guardiola's 350th as City manager. It also signified another Premier League record for consecutive games won by a margin of three or more goals.

On 15 May, City fought back from conceding two first-half goals to draw 2–2 with West Ham, and could have won the match but for a late penalty miss from  Riyad Mahrez. This was the first time since 2012 that City had come back from a two goal deficit in a game. Nevertheless, the result still meant City would win the league if they won their final fixture at home to Aston Villa.

The season ended in dramatic circumstances on 22 May with City coming back from 0–2 for the second consecutive fixture. With 15 minutes remaining, the Citizens scored three goals in five minutes, including a brace from İlkay Gündoğan, to beat Aston Villa 3–2 and ensure they would win the Premier league with 93 points, one more than Liverpool, and retain the title amid jubilant scenes at the Etihad.

First-team squad

 

Ordered by squad number.Appearances include league and cup appearances, including as substitute.Includes EDS players who train regularly with the first team, having made at least one previous league appearance.Ages stated are as of 22 May 2022.

Transfers

Transfers in

Transfers out

Loans out

Pre-season and friendlies
On 14 July, City announced they would host Preston North End at the Academy Stadium on 27 July, and would travel to France to take on fellow CFG club Troyes on 31 July. The Troyes game was later postponed indefinitely due to COVID-19 restrictions in France and England. Had the match taken place, City would have had to quarantine and therefore miss their FA Community Shield match against Leicester City. It was replaced by a game against Barnsley on 31 July. The same day, City's final preseason friendly against Blackpool was announced and scheduled for 3 August.

Competitions

Overview

Premier League

League table

Results summary

Results by matchday

Matches
The league fixtures were announced on 16 June 2021.

FA Cup

As a Premier League club, City entered the tournament in the third round proper. The third round draw was held on 6 December 2021 live on ITV4, before the second round tie between Boreham Wood and St. Albans City, by former England internationals David Seaman and Faye White. City were drawn away to League Two side Swindon Town. The draw for the fourth round took place live on ITV ahead of Arsenal's visit to Championship side Nottingham Forest, with former City goalkeeper David James and current Arsenal Women captain Leah Williamson picking out the ties at Wembley Stadium. City were drawn out at home against Fulham. The fifth round draw was held on 5 February 2022 prior to the tie between Liverpool and Cardiff City on ITV by Andrew Cole. City were drawn away to Championship side Peterborough United, who they had only played once before: on their way to the 1981 FA Cup final. The quarter-final draw was held on 3 March 2022 prior to the tie between Everton and Boreham Wood on ITV by England manager Gareth Southgate. City were drawn away to fellow Premier League side Southampton. The semi-final draw was made by Robbie Fowler at the City Ground on ITV before the quarter-final between Nottingham Forest and Liverpool. City were drawn against the winner of that tie, who turned out to be Liverpool after a hard fought 1–0 victory.

EFL Cup

The draw for the third round was made on 25 August 2021 live on Sky Sports after the conclusion of the second round tie between West Bromwich Albion and Arsenal by Kevin Phillips and Kevin Campbell. City were drawn at home versus League One side Wycombe Wanderers. The draw for the fourth round was made on 22 September 2021 after the conclusion of the third round ties by Micah Richards and Harry Redknapp. City were drawn away to fellow Premier League side West Ham United, who had beaten Manchester United at Old Trafford in the third round.

FA Community Shield

UEFA Champions League

Group stage

The draw for the group stage was held on 26 August 2021 with the fixtures being announced a day later.

Knockout phase

Round of 16
The draw for the round of 16 was held on 13 December 2021 at UEFA's headquarters in Nyon. An administrative error led to a first draw being declared null and void after a series of errors, including some seeded teams being allowed into the draw with runners-up from their own qualification groups. City had initially been drawn against Villarreal. The draw was subsequently redone three hours later and City were drawn against Sporting CP, who they had last met and lost on away goals to in the last 16 of the 2011–12 UEFA Europa League.

Quarter-finals
The draw for the quarter-finals was held on 18 March 2022. City were drawn against Atlético Madrid, against whom they had never played a competitive fixture before.

Semi-finals
The draw for the semi-finals was held on 18 March 2022, after the quarter-final draw.

Statistics

Overall
Appearances (Apps) numbers are for appearances in competitive games only, including sub appearances.
Red card numbers denote: numbers in parentheses represent red cards overturned for wrongful dismissal.Source for all stats:

Goalscorers
Includes all competitive matches. The list is sorted alphabetically by surname when total goals are equal.

Assists
Includes all competitive matches. The list is sorted alphabetically by surname when total assists are equal.

Hat-tricks

4 - Player scored four goals

Clean sheets
The list is sorted by shirt number when total clean sheets are equal. Numbers in parentheses represent games where both goalkeepers participated and both kept a clean sheet; the number in parentheses is awarded to the goalkeeper who was substituted on, whilst a full clean sheet is awarded to the goalkeeper who was on the field at the start of play.

Awards
In the end of season awards, Kevin De Bruyne won Premier League Player of the Season for the second time, and the club's own Player of the Season award for the fourth time, equalling the club record; Phil Foden won Premier League Young Player of the Season and the PFA Young Player of the Year, both for the second consecutive season; while Ederson won the Premier League Golden Glove for the third consecutive season, this time sharing the award with Liverpool's first choice keeper Alisson (both were on 20 clean sheets). Three City players were also included in the PFA Team of the Year (Cancelo, De Bruyne and Silva).

Premier League Player of the Season
Awarded by a vote of a shortlist on the Premier League website

PFA Young Player of the Year

Premier League Young Player of the Season
Awarded by a vote of a shortlist on the Premier League website

Premier League Golden Glove

 shared with Alisson

PFA Team of the Year

Etihad Player of the Year
Awarded by a vote of a shortlist on the Manchester City website

This was De Bruyne's fourth player of the year award, equalling a club record by Richard Dunne

UEFA Champions League Team of the Season
Selected by UEFA's Technical Observer panel

Etihad Player of the Month
Awarded by an online vote by supporters on the official Manchester City F.C. website.

Premier League Player of the Month

Premier League Manager of the Month

Premier League Goal of the Month

LMA Performance of the Week
Awarded by a panel of LMA members and football experts.

See also
 2021–22 in English football
 List of Manchester City F.C. seasons

Notes

References

2021–22
Manchester City
Manchester City
Manchester City
English football championship-winning seasons